The Arkansas State Senate is the upper branch of the Arkansas General Assembly. The Senate consists of 35 members, each representing a district with about 83,000 people. Service in the state legislature is part-time, and many state senators have full-time jobs during the rest of the year. During the current term, the Senate contains twenty-nine Republicans and six Democrats.

History
The Arkansas Senate was created and re-created by the Arkansas Constitution ratified on January 30, 1836. It is now governed by the fifth and current constitution of Arkansas  adopted in 1874.

During the Reconstruction era after the American Civil War, the federal government passed the Reconstruction Acts and enfranchised African Americans. Many African Americans served in the Arkansas House and a smaller number in the Arkansas Senate (African-American officeholders during and following the Reconstruction era) until Democrats reasserted white supremacy and barred them from voting and holding office as was done across the American south.

In 1947, the Arkansas Legislative Council committee was created to collect data for legislators and oversee the Bureau of Legislative Research, which is composed of professional, nonpartisan staff to aid in the legislative process. The committee consists of 36 legislators, 16 of which are state senators.

In 1964, Dorathy M. Allen became the first woman elected to the Arkansas Senate. During her time in office, she was the only female in the Arkansas Senate.

Legislators met biennially until a 2008 ballot initiative created annual legislative sessions. In 1992, voters approved term limits of two four-year terms. In 2014, term limits were extended to 16 years cumulative in either house. In 2020, voters approved a constitutional amendment changing terms limits to 12 consecutive years with the opportunity to return after a 4-year break. This change only affects legislators elected after the November 2020 elections. Legislators elected in the November 2020 elections or earlier can serve 16 years consecutively or non-consecutively and return once 4 years have passed from their last term expiring.

Powers and process
Arkansas state senators are responsible for making and amending the laws of Arkansas in collaboration with the Arkansas House of Representatives and the governor. Senators begin the legislative process by submitting bill requests to the staff of the Bureau of Legislative Research that drafts a bill to conform to the author's intent. Bills are then filed with the Secretary of the Arkansas Senate or an assistant secretary of the Arkansas Senate. The legislative process during the legislative session mirrors that of other state legislatures in the United States. Bills are introduced on First Reading and assigned to a committee, vetted by the committee, undergo Second and Third Readings on the floor of the Senate, go to the opposite house of the legislature, and return or go directly to the governor. The governor has veto power, but two-thirds of the membership of both houses of the legislature can override that veto.

State senators are also responsible for approving the governor's appointments and 16 members of the Arkansas Senate serve on the Arkansas Legislative Council and the Joint Auditing Committee. The Arkansas Legislative Council oversees the Bureau of Legislative Research, which provides professional support services for legislators. It also acts as an organizing committee and members of the council exert a greater degree of influence over the legislative process and outcome.

Terms and qualifications
The senators are usually elected for four-year terms. After the U.S. Census every ten years, all Senate districts are redrawn to ensure that they each have approximately the same number of constituents. After redistricting, every senate position appears on the ballot in the next election. Following this, senators draw lots, and 18 are allotted a two-year term while 17 receive a four-year term. This staggers elections so that only half the body is up for re-election every two years.

Two-year terms drawn by a senator after reapportionment do not count against a senator's service under the term limits amendment, which limits Arkansas state senators to two terms of four years. A senator who draws a two-year term can serve for 10 or even 12 years, depending on when they were elected.

Arkansas Constitution – Article 5. Legislative Department. § 3. Senate.

The Senate shall consist of members to be chosen every four years, by the qualified electors of the several districts. At the first session of the Senate, the Senators shall divide themselves into two classes, by lot, and the first class shall hold their places for two years only, after which all shall be elected for four years.

They are also limited to serving no more than two four-year terms.

Arkansas Constitution – Amendment 73. Arkansas Term Limitation Amendment. § 2(b). Legislative Branch.

The Arkansas Senate shall consist of members to be chosen every four years by the qualified electors of the several districts. No member of the Arkansas Senate may serve more than two such four-year terms.

Current composition

Organization
The President of the Senate is the presiding officer of the Arkansas Senate, but the President Pro Tempore is the presiding officer in the absence of the Senate president. In practice, the President Pro Tempore generally serves as the presiding officer. Other Senate leadership positions include Majority leader, Whip and minority party positions. Committee assignments are determined by seniority, according to the rules of the Senate.

Officers

Floor Leaders

Committees
Current committees include:

Agriculture, Forestry & Economic Development
Senate Small Business & Economic Development
Senate Forestry & Natural Resources
Ar Legislative Council
Children And Youth Committee
Senate Children & Youth Subcommittee
City, County & Local Affairs Committee
Education Committee
Public School Employee Health Insurance Subcommittee
Ar Comprehensive School Improvement Plans
Insurance & Commerce
Senate Financial Institutions Subcommittee
Judiciary Committee
Senate Health Services Subcom. (Synthetic Marijuana-K2)
Senate Court And Civil Law Subcommittee
Senate Correction, Criminal Law & Child Support Subcom.
Public Health - Senate Subcommittee On Minority Health
Public Health - Senate Substance Abuse Treatment Services Subcommittee
Public Health, Welfare And Labor Committee
Senate Labor & Environment Subcommittee
Senate Human Services Subcommittee
Senate Health Services
Revenue & Tax
Senate Subcommittee On Economic And Tax Policy
Senate Sales, Use, Misc. Taxes & Exepmtions Sub.
Senate Biennial Institute
Senate Efficiency
Senate Rules, Resolutions & Memorials
Winthrop Rockefeller Memorial Subcommittee
State Agencies & Govt'L Affairs
Senate Election Laws Subcommittee
State Agencies & Gov'T Affairs - Senate Constitutional Issues Subcommittee
State Agencies & Govt'L Affairs - Senate Sub. On Cosmetology Board Rules
Transportation, Technology & Legislative Affairs
Senate Waterways & Aeronautics Subcommittee
Senate Motor Vehicle & Highways Subcommittee

Current Senators

Past composition of the Senate

See also

Arkansas House of Representatives

References

External links

 
Sen
Sen
State upper houses in the United States